Arthur Briggs Shaw (April 28, 1886 - July 18, 1955) was an American athlete and member of the Irish American Athletic Club. He won the bronze medal in the men's 110 metres hurdles race at the 1908 Summer Olympics in London. He was a graduate of Dartmouth College.

References

External links
 Sports Reference

1886 births
1955 deaths
Athletes (track and field) at the 1908 Summer Olympics
American male hurdlers
Dartmouth College alumni
Olympic bronze medalists for the United States in track and field
Medalists at the 1908 Summer Olympics